The Chelyabinsk meteorite (Russian: Челябинский метеорит, Chelyabinskii meteorit) is the fragmented remains of the large Chelyabinsk meteor of 15 February 2013 which reached the ground after the meteor's passage through the atmosphere.  The descent of the meteor, visible as a brilliant superbolide in the morning sky, caused a series of shock waves that shattered windows, damaged approximately 7,200 buildings and left 1,491 people injured. The resulting fragments were scattered over a wide area.

Naming 

The meteor and meteorite are named after Chelyabinsk Oblast, over which the meteor exploded.  An initial proposal was to name the meteorite after Lake Chebarkul, where one of its major fragments impacted and made a 6-metre-wide hole in the frozen lake surface.

Composition and classification 

The meteorite has been classified as an LL5 ordinary chondrite. First estimates of its composition indicate about 10% of meteoric iron, as well as olivine and sulfides.

Asteroid 

The impacting asteroid started to brighten up in the general direction of the Pegasus constellation, close to the East horizon where the Sun was starting to rise.  The impactor belonged to the Apollo group of near-Earth asteroids.

At an altitude of about 23.3 km (14.5 miles) the body exploded in a meteor air burst. Meteorite fragments of the body landed on the ground.

Analysis of three fragments using optical microscopy, electron microscopy, Raman spectroscopy, and isotopic composition techniques used to date Solar System objects, showed the isotopic clocks in the asteroids (rubidium and strontium ratios, argon isotope ratios) appear to have partially or totally reset in past collisions. The isotopic clock resets may result from thermal effects changing isotopic ratios, and changes to cosmic radiation exposure. The asteroid appears to have had eight major collisions, around 4.53, 4.45, 3.73, 2.81, and 1.46 billion years ago, then at 852, 312, and 27 million years ago.

Meteorite 

Scientists collected 53 samples from near a 6-metre-wide hole in the ice of Lake Chebarkul, thought to be the result of a single meteorite fragment impact. The specimens are of various sizes, with the largest being , and initial laboratory analysis confirmed their meteoric origin.

In June 2013, Russian scientists reported that further investigation by magnetic imaging below the location of the ice hole in Lake Chebarkul had identified a  meteorite buried in the mud at the bottom of the lake. It was examined by scientists and handed over to the local authorities, who put it on display at the Chelyabinsk State Museum of Local Lore, causing protests from the followers of the recently established "Church of Chelyabinsk Meteorite".

In the aftermath of the superbolide air burst, a large number of small meteorite fragments fell on areas west of Chelyabinsk, including Deputatskoye, generally at terminal velocity, about the speed of a piece of gravel dropped from a skyscraper. Local residents and schoolchildren located and picked up some of the meteorites, many located in snowdrifts, by following a visible hole that had been left in the outer surface of the snow. Speculators became active in the informal market for meteorite fragments that rapidly emerged.

Popular culture 

 , some reports surfaced of people trying to sell fake meteorites on the Internet.
 On 15 February (anniversary of the event), during the 2014 Winter Olympics, winners received medals with embedded fragments of the meteorite.
 The "Church of the Chelyabinsk Meteorite" has been set up in the Russian city of Chelyabinsk. The founder of the church, Andrey Breyvichko, claims that the large meteorite fragment retrieved from the lake contains a coded "set of moral and legal norms that will help people live at a new stage of spiritual knowledge development". Breyvichko opposes the operation to expose the meteorite fragment in a museum, claiming that only "psychic priests" of his church are qualified to decode and handle the celestial body, which they want to be placed in a temple to be built in Chelyabinsk for the purpose.

Gallery

See also

Meteorite fall

References

External links 

 
 
 Chelyabinsk Meteorite oxfordre.com

Chondrite meteorites
Meteorites found in Russia
2013 in Russia
2013 in space
Modern Earth impact events
Meteorite
February 2013 events in Russia